Raam is a 2005 Indian Tamil-language mystery thriller film written, produced and directed by Ameer. The film stars Jiiva, Gajala and Saranya Ponvannan in lead roles with Kunal Shah, Rahman, Ganja Karuppu  and Murali playing supporting roles. The film's score and soundtrack are composed by Yuvan Shankar Raja. The film was released on 4 March 2005 and slowly became a sleeper hit. It was screened at the 2006 Cyprus International Film Festival, where it won two awards for Best Actor and Best Musical Score for Jiiva and Yuvan Shankar Raja, respectively. The film was critically acclaimed with praise for the performances of Jiiva and Saranya, screenplay, music and cinematography. The film was remade in Hindi as Bolo Raam (2009) and in Kannada as Huchcha 2 (2018).

Plot

The story revolves around a mother-son relationship set in Kodaikanal. The movie commences with Rama Krishna and his mother Saradha, a school teacher, lying in a pool of blood. The police find that Raam is still alive and arrests him on charges of murdering his mother. Police Inspector Umar works on the case. The story is narrated in a flashback. Raam is a mentally affected teenager (later diagnosed as autistic) living dependent on his mother. His over compulsive adoration for her lands her in various problems. Raam is provoked easily and tolerates little wrongdoing around him. Next door lives Karthikayeni, the daughter of a Sub-Inspector Malaichamy. She falls for Raam, but upon telling him how she feels, gets a blunt response from him. One day, Saradha is found brutally murdered. Umar grills each and every person connected to her and Raam. Every possible motive Raam might have for murdering his mother is explored. Raam's neighbors, Malaichamy, and his children are summoned by Umar for interrogation. The police eventually find out that it was Karthika's brother Satish who committed the murder, fearing Saradha would tell his parents about his drug addiction. When Umar confronts Satish and forces him to surrender, Satish fatally wounds him and escapes, injuring his father in the process. On finding her brother's hideout, Karthika tries to plead with him to surrender, but he refuses to do so and ties her up. Raam, seeking vengeance, finds the hideout. A brutal fight occurs between the two, and Raam kills Satish. The film ends as the police find the hideout while Raam is meditating on a dilapidated roof.

Cast
 Jiiva as Ramakrishnan "Ram"
 Saranya Ponvannan as Saradha
 Gajala as Karthikayeni
 Rahman as Umar 
 Kunal Shah as Satish
 Murali as Malaichami
 Ganja Karuppu as Vaazhavandhan
 Prathap Pothan as Psychiatrist
 Aruldoss as Reporter (uncredited)

Production
Ameer revealed while he was working in Nandha (2001), he got to witness an incident in an local news channel where an 20 year old boy sitting near his mother's corpse feeling remorse for murdering his mother which triggered Ameer to make a film on that incident however he changed the script by not portraying the son as murderer. In order to portray his character Ram, Jiiva had to remain blank and did a lot of recce and also met a person who had autism and observed his mannerisms.

Soundtrack
The music was scored by Yuvan Shankar Raja, joining with the director Ameer Sultan. The soundtrack, released on 12 January 2005, features 7 tracks, including one instrumental. Yuvan Shankar Raja fetched critical acclaim for his work, especially for the film score, resulting in a win at the 2006 Cyprus International Film Festival for Best Musical score in a Feature Film, being the only Indian composer to receive the award till date. All Lyrics were penned by Snehan.

Critical reception
The Hindu wrote "Crafted with care and treated with finesse, "Raam" is a luminous feather in the maker's cap."  Visual Dasan of Kalki called  Raam as "A miracle cure for rotten taste".

Awards
The film has won the following awards since its release:

2006 Cyprus International Film Festival
 Won — CIFF Award for Best Actor in a Feature Film - Jiiva
 Won — CIFF Award for Best Musical Score in a Feature Film - Yuvan Shankar Raja

References

External links 
 

2000s mystery thriller films
2000s Tamil-language films
2005 crime thriller films
2005 films
Films about autism
Films directed by Ameer (director)
Films scored by Yuvan Shankar Raja
Films shot in Kodaikanal
Indian crime thriller films
Indian mystery thriller films
Indian nonlinear narrative films
Tamil films remade in other languages